Comparative work of the Afroasiatic languages uses a semi-conventionalized set of symbols that are somewhat different than the International Phonetic Alphabet and other phonetic notations. The more salient differences include the letters  for IPA , the circumflex diacritic  for lateral obstruents, and the sub-dot  for emphatic consonants, which depending on the language may be ejective, implosive or pharyngealized.

Conventions

Letters
Phonetic conventions are as follows:

 is used only for Egyptian. Its value is not certain. 

Palatal/palatalized consonants are indicated with an acute accent: ; retroflex often with a grave accent:  etc.; and uvulars sometimes with an inverted breve:  etc.  may be distinguished as a labialized consonant vs a consonant followed by a rounded vowel.

Vowels
 are long vowels;  etc. are short vowels.  is a neutral vowel (schwa).

Symbols for reconstruction
Wildcards include:
V for an undetermined vowel: {a, i, u}; 
H for a laryngeal or pharyngeal consonant: {ḥ, ʕ, ʔ, h}; 
S for a sibilant: {s, z, c, ʒ, č, ǯ, ṣ, c̣, č̣}. 
Thus *bVr- is shorthand for "either *bar- or *bir- or *bur-".

/ means "or", e.g. *gaw/y- is *gaw- or *gay-.
( ) means "with or without", e.g. *ba(w)r- is *bawr- or *bar-.
~ means parallel proto-forms, e.g. *ʕad-at- ~ *ʕidd- means that the proto-form has two variant reconstructions.

See also
Proto-Afroasiatic language

References

Phonetic alphabets